Gilberto Garcia Flores (born October 27, 1952) is a retired Major League Baseball player.

Following the  season, he went to the California Angels in the minor league draft.

He began the  season assigned to the triple A Salt Lake City Gulls before being dealt to the New York Mets for a player to be named later on July 28. He joined the Mets as a September call-up, and batted .276 in eleven games. He remained in the minors with the Mets through .

See also
 List of Major League Baseball players from Puerto Rico

External links
, or The Ultimate Mets Database

1952 births
Living people
Major League Baseball players from Puerto Rico
Major League Baseball outfielders
California Angels players
New York Mets players
Bluefield Orioles players
Miami Orioles players
El Paso Sun Kings players
Salinas Packers players
Salt Lake City Gulls players
Tidewater Tides players